Gordon Stevens Wakefield (15 January 1921 – 11 September 2000) was a Methodist minister, academic and author.

He was educated at Crewe County Secondary School, the University of Manchester, Fitzwilliam College, Cambridge, Wesley House and St Catherine's College, Oxford.

Wakefield was a Methodist circuit minister in Edgware, Woodstock, Stockport, Newcastle upon Tyne and Bristol. He was Methodist Connexional Editor from 1963 to 1971; chairman of the Manchester and Stockport Methodist District from 1971 to 1979; principal of Queen's College, Birmingham, from 1979 to 1987 (and also a Lecturer at the University of Birmingham); chaplain of Westminster College, Oxford, from 1988 to 1989 and director of the Alister Hardy Research Centre from 1989 to 1992.

References

People educated at Ruskin High School, Crewe
Alumni of St Catherine's College, Oxford
Alumni of the University of Manchester
Alumni of Fitzwilliam College, Cambridge
Alumni of Wesley House
1921 births
2000 deaths
Holders of a Lambeth degree
Academics of the University of Birmingham
Principals of Queen's College, Birmingham
20th-century Methodist ministers